Arthur Anderson may refer to:

Businessmen
Arthur Anderson (businessman) (1792–1868), Scottish businessman and co-founder of the Peninsular and Oriental Steam Navigation Company (P&O)
Arthur E. Andersen (1885–1947), founder of Chicago-based accounting firm

Sportsmen
Arthur Anderson (athlete) (1886–1967), British track-and-field athlete who competed in the 1912 Olympics
Art Anderson (basketball) (1916–1983), American professional basketball player
Art Anderson (born 1936), college and professional American football player

Others
Arthur Anderson (dramatist) (1873–1942), English dramatist and lyricist
Arthur J. O. Anderson (1907–1996), anthropologist and Nahuatl translator
Arthur Anderson (actor) (1922–2016), American actor 
Arthur Anderson (architect) (1868–1942), Australian architect
Arthur Anderson (politician) (1860–1915), Australian politician

See also
Arthur Andersen, accounting firm
Arthur Andersen LLP v. United States, U.S. Supreme Court case
SS Arthur M. Anderson, ship on the Great Lakes